Sainthamaruthu is a coastal town in Sri Lanka, with a population of 25,412. It is located on the east coast of Ampara District of Eastern Province, Sri Lanka. This town is fully populated by Sri Lankan Muslims according to the Department of Census and Statistics October 2007.

Sainthamaruthu is located in the middle of other municipalities such as Sammanthurai on the west, Kalmunai on the North, Karativu on the south, and the eastern border with the Bay of Bengal.

Divisions

Sainthamaruthu DS division has 16 Grama Niladhari Divisions. It is bordered by Kalmunai DS division to the north, the sea on the east, Karaitivu DS division to the south and Sammanthurai to the west. 50.4% of the population are men and 49.6% are women. Forty-two percent of the population is less than 18 years old, 48% of the population is between the age of 19-64 and 10% of the population is above 65 years of age. The population density of the division is 3072/sq km.

Economy
Sainthamaruthu is highly urbanised and congested due to increasing commercial activities in the main urban areas of the town. The eastern site is potential for fishing and western site is fully engaged with paddy cultivation.

Resources and livelihood activities 

Sainthamaruthu is well endowed with many natural resources. Fisheries, agriculture, and services contribute significantly to the local economy; and trade also plays an important role. It started with petty trade in the early history of the division and nowadays, has expanded to large-scale trading. In early times, fishery activities took place using traditional craft (Katumarang) and ordinary seines and now activity has expanded to deep sea fishing.

Many people living here are engaged in agriculture, fisheries and various other sectors. About 13% of the population is unemployed and many of the workers are poorly paid.

The main agricultural crop is paddy. Around 1132 acres of land are cultivated annually within the division and most of the farmers’ paddy land is situated in the outside of the Sainthamaruthu.

The main sources of income in the local economy of Sainthamaruthu:

 Agriculture (e.g. paddy, coconut, other field crops and horticulture)
 Deep sea and aquatic fisheries.
 Livestock rearing
 Trade
 Micro and small industries

References 

 http://www.statistics.gov.lk/PopHouSat/CPH2011/index.php?fileName=pop33&gp=Activities&tpl=3

External links 
 http://wikimapia.org/2543545/Sainthamaruthu
 http://www.sainthamaruthu.ds.gov.lk/
 https://web.archive.org/web/20101201030126/http://www.kalmunaimc.com/
 http://www.sainthamaruth.com/

Towns in Ampara District
Sainthamaruthu DS Division